Woodhall Junction railway station (previously Kirkstead railway station) is a former station in Woodhall, Lincolnshire. It served as a junction where several different lines met, none of which are still open.

The station opened as Kirkstead (Kirkstead and Horncastle according to the notice in "The Times") on 17 October 1848 as part of the "Lincolnshire Loop Line" between Lincoln and Boston which largely followed the course of the River Witham.

A branch line was opened from Kirkstead to Horncastle via Woodhall Spa by the Horncastle Railway on 11 August 1855 by which time the station was known as Kirkstead.

The Kirkstead and Little Steeping Railway, known locally as the "New Line", opened in 1913 leaving the Loop Line just south of Woodhall Junction and cut across the fens to Midville allowing faster journey times to Skegness.

The renaming of the station from Kirkstead to Woodhall Junction in 1922 was an attempt to increase the profile of Woodhall Spa as a holiday destination.

The station was host to a LNER camping coach for the 1935 season.

The lines through the station closed at different times: 
The branch line to Horncastle closed to passengers on 13 September 1954.
The Lincolnshire Loop Line route from Lincoln to Boston via Tattershall closed to passengers on 17 June 1963.
On 5 April 1971 the Goods Service between Lincoln - Bardney - Woodhall Junction and Horncastle was withdrawn - the last line to stay open through the station.

It is now a private residence, but the platforms and former goods yard are clearly still visible

References

External links
 Private web site with history & photos
 Photo of derelict station.

Disused railway stations in Lincolnshire
Former Great Northern Railway stations
Railway stations in Great Britain opened in 1848
Railway stations in Great Britain closed in 1970
Beeching closures in England